Brake Fail is a 2009 Bengali film. The film was directed by Kaushik Ganguly. The film was produced by Mumbai Mantra and the music of the film was composed by Neel Dutt.

Plot

Cast 
 Parambrata Chattopadhyay
 Swastika Mukherjee
 Annu Kapoor
 Saswata Chatterjee
 Santu Mukhopadhyay
 Arindam Sil
 Lama (Arindam Haldar)
 Taranga Biswas
 Paran Bandopadhyay
 Tanima Sen

Songs 
 "Jodi Proshno Karo" - Shaan, Shreya Ghoshal
 "Jinga La la"
 "Shorey Shorey Jay"- Shaan, Shreya Ghoshal
 "Rang Laga De"
 "Bhenge Mor Ghorer Chabi"
 "Ghure Taakalei"

See also 
 Laptop, 2008 Bengali film

References 

2009 films
Bengali-language Indian films
Films directed by Kaushik Ganguly
2000s Bengali-language films